Marc de Maar (born 15 February 1984) is a Curaçaoan former professional road racing cyclist, who rode professionally between 2006 and 2018.

Biography

Amateur career
At the age of 14, de Maar was ice skating in the winter and cycling in the summer, with better results in cycling.

In his first year as a junior for that team, de Maar won some races, and finished 18th in the World Road race championship for young riders. The second year was not so good, and after his contract ended in 2002, he did not get a new contract.

De Maar found a different team, "Löwik-Tegeltoko". In 2003, he performed better, although he had no victories. Still, the Rabobank team decided to sign him again.

Professional career

In the 2012 Tour of Britain, de Maar took the victory on the fifth stage. With  left, he hit the tarmac with two other riders after taking a corner too wide. He slowly picked himself up, got back on his bike and reintegrated the group. He rode away solo  from the finish, and crossed the line with an advantage of 15 seconds on the chasers.

In September 2014 it was announced that de Maar would join the new  squad for 2015.

Major results

1999
 1st Classique del Alpes U19
2003
 3rd Overall Triptyque Ardennais
 6th Circuit de Wallonie
 8th Rund um den Henninger Turm U23
 9th Overall Flèche du Sud
2004
 1st Rund um den Henninger Turm U23
 1st Hasselt–Spa–Hasselt
 2nd Internatie Reningelst
 3rd Overall Thüringen Rundfahrt der U23
 8th Road race, UCI Under-23 Road World Championships
 8th Hel van het Mergelland
 9th Overall Giro d'Abruzzo
2005
 1st  Overall Tour du Loir-et-Cher
1st Stage 3
 1st  Overall Le Triptyque des Monts et Châteaux
 Olympia's Tour
1st Prologue & Stage 8
 1st Stage 2 Tour de Gironde
 5th Grand Prix de la Ville de Lillers
 9th Ronde van Drenthe
2008
 6th Trofeo Sóller
2009
 7th Overall Tour of Hainan
2010
 Netherlands Antilles Road Championships
1st  Road race
1st  Time trial
 3rd Overall Tour de Beauce
1st Stages 3 & 5
 5th Chrono de Gatineau
2011
 1st  Road race, Pan American Games
 Curaçao National Road Championships
1st  Road race
1st  Time trial
2012
 Curaçao National Road Championships
1st  Road race
1st  Time trial
 1st Stage 5 Tour of Britain
 2nd Amstel Curaçao Race
 4th Overall Tour of the Gila
 5th Volta Limburg Classic
 6th Overall Tour de Beauce
 Pan American Road Championships
7th Road race
8th Time trial
2013
 1st Stage 5 Tour de Beauce
 3rd Amstel Curaçao Race
 8th Volta Limburg Classic
 10th Les Boucles du Sud Ardèche
2014
 1st  Mountains classification Tour of Turkey
 2nd Overall Tour of Norway
1st Stage 2
 7th Overall Tour de San Luis
 7th Overall Tour des Fjords
2015
 2nd Overall Tour de Luxembourg
 5th Trofeo Serra de Tramuntana
2017
 5th Overall Tour of China I
 6th Overall Tour of Hainan
2018
 1st Overall Tour de Kumano
1st Points classification
1st Mountains classification

References

External links 

 

Dutch male cyclists
Cyclists at the 2011 Pan American Games
1984 births
Living people
People from Assen
UCI Road World Championships cyclists for the Netherlands
Cyclists from Drenthe
Pan American Games gold medalists for the Netherlands Antilles
Pan American Games medalists in cycling
Medalists at the 2011 Pan American Games
Dutch people of Curaçao descent